Windermere is a community on Lake Rosseau, located within and governed by the municipality of Muskoka Lakes. Windermere hosts two resorts, two community centres, two public beaches, two public docks, an eighteen-hole golf course and a post office all within a 500 metre radius.

Attractions and Venues 
Besides the town, which maintains much of its older architecture, there are several tourist and cultural sites:

 Windermere House Resort
 Windermere Golf & Country Club
 Windermere Village Hall
 Windermere Community Centre
 Windermere Wharf
 Muskoka Chautauqua

References 

Communities in the District Municipality of Muskoka